33-year-old meatpacker Fred Rouse was lynched on December 11, 1921, in Fort Worth, Texas.

Background

In 1921, the whites-only union workers at the Swift & Co. meatpacking plant in the Niles City Stockyards (now part of Fort Worth) went on strike. The owners attempted to replace them with black strikebreakers. During union protests, there was a scuffle between African-American worker Fred Rouse and some of the strikers. This resulted in Rouse firing his gun, wounding two white strikers who happened to be brothers.

Lynching

Enraged, the whites seized, beat, and stabbed him. He was presumed to be dead. However, when the police retrieved his body from the mob, they realized that he was still alive. They took him to the City & County Hospital (330 E. 4th St.). He spent several days recovering in the segregated ward, which was located in the basement. When members of the striking union heard that Rouse was still alive, a mob of about 30 men snuck into the hospital and were able to identify him by his severe skull injury. Despite the pleas of the night nurse to spare him, the mob dragged him out of the hospital in his nightgown. He was strung up on a tree at the corner of NE 12th Street and Samuels Avenue in Fort Worth, Texas. The white mob took turns riddling his mutilated body with gunshots.

Aftermath

The union officially disavowed the lynching. Six suspected members of the lynch mob were later indicted, including 2 policemen, but they never went to trial.

The Tarrant County Coalition for Peace and Justice (TCCPJ), a nonprofit dedicated to memorializing victims of racial violence, broke ground on Saturday, December 11, 2021, for a historical marker that will stand at Rouse's lynching site.

Bibliography 
Notes

References

 - Total pages: 440
 - Total pages: 598

1921 riots
1921 in Texas
African-American history of Texas
History of Phillips County, Arkansas
Lynching deaths in Texas
December 1921 events
Protest-related deaths
Racially motivated violence against African Americans
Riots and civil disorder in Arkansas
White American riots in the United States